Under the Whyte notation for the classification of steam locomotives,  represents the wheel arrangement of no leading wheels, four powered and coupled driving wheels on two axles and four trailing wheels on two axles mounted in a bogie.

Overview
The  wheel arrangement was usually found on railmotors, vehicles for passenger carrying that operated on routes where passenger numbers were light. It usually consisted of a single coach with its own prime mover. William Bridges Adams in the United Kingdom began building railmotors in small numbers as early as 1848.

Usage

Cape of Good Hope
A single Railmotor was delivered to the Cape Government Railways (CGR) in 1906. The railmotor was a self-contained motor-coach in which the locomotive and coach were embodied in a single vehicle, with a driver's station at the rear end of the coach for reverse running. The locomotive part was a 0-4-0 side-tank engine which was built by North British Locomotive Company, while the coach part on a single bogie was built by Metropolitan Amalgamated Railway Carriage & Wagon.

Transvaal Colony
In 1907, the Central South African Railways (CSAR) acquired a single self-contained railmotor for the low-volume railmotor passenger service which had been introduced the previous year. It was a self-contained motor-coach with a 56-seat capacity in which the engine, boiler and coach were embodied in a single vehicle. To negotiate curves and points, the power unit could pivot like a bogie. The railmotor was erected at the Salt River shops of the CGR in Cape Town and entered service on the CSAR on 10 August 1907.

References

 
 
Whyte notation